"Mum's Army" is the ninth episode of the fourth series of the British comedy series Dad's Army. It was originally transmitted on Friday 20 November 1970.

Synopsis
Mainwaring's plans to involve the women of Walmington in the platoon become rather too personal.

Plot
Mainwaring is convening a parade, and is growing fed up of Jones' slowness. Walker suggests nodding his head whenever he wants them to come to attention, and Jones will understand. Mainwaring dismisses this, but Jones takes it on board, standing to attention and standing at ease whenever Mainwaring nods his head.

Mainwaring informs the platoon that the women of Walmington-on-Sea want to join their platoon to help the war effort. He and Wilson thought that this was a good idea, as it would allow the men of the platoon to 'grapple' with the enemy. Mainwaring suggests that they could serve in the canteen, and Frazer adds that they could sew on their jacket buttons. The platoon are asked to bring as many female volunteers as they can.

The next evening, Mainwaring enrols some of the women, including the flashy Mrs Fox, the quiet Ivy Samways, and the tarty Edith Parish, who were recruited by Jones, Pike and Walker respectively. Frazer informs Mainwaring that his recruit, Miss Ironside of the Gas Light and Coke Company, will be unavailable until tomorrow, as will Mrs Pike. As Wilson leaves to dismiss the parade, a lady of about middle-age enters and introduces herself as Mrs Fiona Gray. Mainwaring is immediately smitten with her, and it is clear that his feelings are reciprocated.

Mrs Gray is from London, she had to bring her mother down because the bombing was too much for her, and is now living in Wilton Gardens, not far from Mainwaring's house. She remarks that her life consists only of morning coffee, and making dahlias grow. Mainwaring admits he's fond of dahlias, but Elizabeth isn't.

The following parade Mainwaring teaches the women, who now include Miss Ironside and Mrs Pike, the rudiments of foot drill, including left turns, right turns, and the attention and at ease positions. He criticises everyone, except Mrs Gray, who is "very good". Walker passes several lewd remarks about Godfrey and the ladies, and is eventually ordered home.

Some time later, Mainwaring makes a visit to Anne's Pantry, a tea shop where he knows Mrs Gray regularly visits. Indeed, it isn't long before she arrives, and Mrs Gray's order willingly joins Mainwaring's bill. However, while trying to have a quiet chat, they are interrupted by Godfrey, Jones, Walker, and eventually Pike, who informs Mainwaring that the bank inspectors have arrived, forcing Mainwaring to abandon his chat. Mainwaring leaves as the waitress returns, leaving Mrs Gray to pay for both coffees.

Jones' section are commenting on Mainwaring's recent behaviour. Edith remarks that they went to the pictures together twice over the past week, and Pike says that they have coffee every morning together, however they now frequent the Dutch Oven, due to wagging tongues. Frazer thinks Mainwaring's making a fool of himself. Unbeknown to them, Wilson is listening, and decides to confront Mainwaring.

Wilson skirts round the subject, trying to subtly tell Mainwaring that he's making a fool of himself. However, Mainwaring misconstrues Wilson's incomprehensible speech, and announces that he is disbanding the ladies section, except for a few special helpers, which should, he believes keep Mrs Pike out of Wilson's hair. Wilson is shocked.

Mainwaring notices that Mrs Gray is not on parade. Ivy tells Pike that she saw Mrs Gray head towards Walmington station with two heavy suitcases. Walker reminds Mainwaring that there's only one train at this time of the evening: the 8:40 to London, and Mainwaring quickly makes himself scarce. He confronts Mrs Gray at the station, admitting that he lives from one meeting to the next, and she confesses that she's exactly the same, and that's the reason why she's leaving. Mainwaring implores her to stay, but she boards the train. However, as the train steams off, Mrs Gray promises to write. As the train disappears, Mainwaring is left, standing alone on the station, his face broken with hidden emotion.

Cast

Arthur Lowe as Captain Mainwaring
John Le Mesurier as Sergeant Wilson
Clive Dunn as Lance Corporal Jones
John Laurie as Private Frazer
James Beck as Private Walker
Arnold Ridley as Private Godfrey
Ian Lavender as Private Pike
Carmen Silvera as Mrs Gray
Janet Davies as Mrs Pike
Wendy Richard as Edith Parish
Pamela Cundell as Mrs Fox
Julian Burbury as Miss Ironside
Rosemary Faith as Ivy Samways
Melita Manger as Waitress
David Gilchrist as Serviceman
Jack Le White as Porter

Notes

The final scene where Mainwaring confronts Mrs Gray at the station pays homage to the 1945 film Brief Encounter starring Trevor Howard and Celia Johnson.
When the platoon go to the tea shop, it is referred to as "Anne's Pantry". The shop appears recurringly in later episodes, but is then referred to as "the Marigold Tea Rooms".
 Carmen Silvera who plays Mrs Gray would later play Rene Artois's wife Edith in 'Allo 'Allo!, another series in which David Croft was involved.
According to Ian Lavender on a 2015 programme about Arthur Lowe on BBC Radio 4 Extra, Do Tell Them Pike: Arthur Lowe on the Radio, Lowe insisted that Carmen Silvera, who had played Mrs Gray in the TV episode, should also be cast for the radio version, or else he would not record this episode.

Further reading

External links

    

Dad's Army (series 4) episodes
1970 British television episodes